The Batesville East Main Historic District is a residential historic district in Batesville, Arkansas.  When first listed on the National Register of Historic Places in 1983, ti encompassed a four-block stretch of Main Street (between 7th and 11th Streets) that was platted out in 1848, as growth of the city expanded to the northeast from its original nucleus.  It was expanded in 1996 to include buildings on College Avenue between 10th and 11th Streets, which abut the original district bounds.  Four houses survive that predate the American Civil War, although three of these were restyled later in the 19th century.  Most of the properties were built before 1910, and are either vernacular or Colonial Revival in style.  There are only a small number of Queen Anne, Shingle, and Craftsman style buildings.  Two were designed by noted Arkansas architect Charles L. Thompson, and one, the Cook-Morrow House, is separately listed on the National Register.

See also
National Register of Historic Places listings in Independence County, Arkansas

References

Italianate architecture in Arkansas
Buildings and structures completed in 1877
Geography of Independence County, Arkansas
Historic districts on the National Register of Historic Places in Arkansas
National Register of Historic Places in Independence County, Arkansas
Buildings and structures in Batesville, Arkansas
1877 establishments in Arkansas